Robert Smirke may refer to:

 Robert Smirke (painter) (1753–1845), English painter
 Robert Smirke (architect) (1780–1867), his son, English architect